The Midnight Library is a fantasy novel by Matt Haig, published on 13 August 2020 by Canongate Books. It was abridged and broadcast on BBC Radio 4 over ten episodes in December 2020.

The novel follows a 35 year old British woman unhappy in her dead-end life who is given the opportunity to experience lives she might have had if she had made different choices.

Plot
The book's protagonist is a young woman named Nora Seed who is unhappy with her choices in life. During the night, she tries to kill herself but ends up in a library managed by her school librarian, Mrs. Elm. The library is situated between life and death with millions of books filled with stories of her life had she made some different decisions. In this library, she then tries to find the life in which she's the most content. For example, in one possible life she tries to reunite with her boyfriend and finds herself married to him, but it isn't the way as she expected. She also sees herself as a glaciologist doing research in the Svalbard archipelago in the Arctic – a very different life from the one she tries to escape, but not necessarily a better choice.

Reception 
The Midnight Library was named a bestseller by The New York Times bestseller, The Boston Globe, and The Washington Post. Good Morning America selected it as a Book Club Pick.

Booklist and BookPage gave the book a starred review. The Book Reporter and The Arts Desk raved about it. The book also received positive reviews from The New York Times,  The Guardian, ZYZZYVA, The Scotsman,The Sunday Times, Library Journal, Kirkus Reviews,The Washington Post, Publishers Weekly,  and Post Independent.  NPR gave a mixed review.

The book was also included in "Best of" lists from The Christian Science Monitor, Amazon, PureWow, She Reads, Lit Hub, St. Louis Public Radio, and The Washington Post.

The Midnight Library was adapted for radio and broadcast in ten episodes on BBC Radio 4 in December 2020.

References 

Magic realism
2020 fantasy novels
2020 British novels
Novels set in England
Canongate Books books